The Om Years is the second compilation album by People Under the Stairs. It is a combination of popular tracks from the group's first four albums (The Next Step, Question in the Form of an Answer, O.S.T. and ...Or Stay Tuned), and also includes extra b-sides and rarities.

The album was released in two formats:
A double-CD album, with the album tracks on the first CD, titled Disc 1: The Om Years, and a second bonus CD, titled Disc 2: B-Sides and Rarities.
A double-LP album, with a selection of the first CD's tracks, and two songs ("The Bomb Combo" and "Out Da Club") from the b-sides & rarities CD.

Om Records released this compilation album in an attempt to capitalize on the buzz about the group's upcoming album, Fun DMC, and the group's past success with the label. The group would return to the Om label on 2009's Carried Away.

CD track listing
All songs written by Christopher "Thes One" Portugal and Michael "Double K" Turner, except where noted.

Disc 1:
Tracks 2, 4 & 20 are from The Next Step (1998).
Tracks 3 & 5-9 are from Question in the Form of an Answer (2000).
Tracks 1 & 10-18 are from O.S.T. (2002).
Track 19 is from ...Or Stay Tuned (2003).
Disc 2:
Tracks 1, 3 & 11 are B-sides from the "We'll Be There" single (2000).
Track 5 is a B-side from the "Youth Explosion" single (2000).
Track 2 is a B-side from the "Jappy Jap" single (2002).
Track 6 is a B-side from the "Acid Raindrops" single (2002).
Track 10 is a B-side from the "Yield" single (2003).
Tracks 4 & 7-9 are from various multi-artist Om compilation albums.

LP track listing
All songs written by Christopher "Thes One" Portugal and Michael "Double K" Turner, except where noted.

References

External links
Official People Under The Stairs Website
Official The Om Years lyrics page on The Point of the Rhyme

2008 compilation albums
People Under the Stairs albums
Om Records albums